Union Trust Building or Union Trust Company Building may refer to:

 Union and New Haven Trust Building, in New Haven, Connecticut
 Union Trust Company Building (Springfield, Massachusetts)
 Guardian Building, in Detroit, Michigan
 Union Trust Company Building (St. Louis, Missouri), listed on the NRHP in Missouri
 Union Trust Building (Cincinnati, Ohio)
 Huntington Bank Building in Cleveland, Ohio
 Union Trust Building (New York City), now demolished
 Union Trust Building (Pittsburgh, Pennsylvania)
 Union Trust Company Building (Providence, Rhode Island)
 Union Trust Building (Seattle), Washington
 Union Trust Building (Washington, D.C.)
 Union Trust & Deposit Co./Union Trust National Bank, Parkersburg, West Virginia